Edi Ersalesi Birsan (also known as Ed Birsan) is a Concord City councilmember (vice mayor in 2017 and mayor in 2018), a game designer, an independent business owner in the maritime container inspection industry,  and one of the best-known American players of the game Diplomacy.  He was born in Brooklyn in 1949, but has resided in the San Francisco Bay Area since 1981. Birsan is married and has two children.

Political career
In 2012, Birsan was elected to his first term for one of two open seats on the city council of Concord, California, and was re-elected in 2016 and 2020. In 2021, Birsan ran for Contra Costa County Board of Supervisors for the District 4 seat unsuccessfully.

Birsan voted in favor of Concord First Partners leading the Concord Naval Weapons Project, a housing and commercial development on a formal naval base. There was opposition from the public due in part to the poor environmental record of some involved companies, but local unions expressed their support for Discovery/Seeno.

References

1949 births
Diplomacy (game)
Living people
People from Brooklyn
American game designers
Mayors of places in California